The 1947–48 Lehigh Engineers men's ice hockey season was the 5th season of play for the program. The Engineers represented Lehigh University and were coached by Charles W. Simmons in his 5th season.

Season
When Lehigh opened their season, they had agreed to participate in a 3-game tournament in Clinton, New York. Unfortunately, as most of the team were new additions who had only 4 practices to get used to one another, the Engineers performed rather poorly. After getting stomped by the hosts 3–17, the squad was throttled by Middlebury 0–22, setting numerous program records on both sides. While the results of the final match with Union were comparatively much better, the Dutchmen were very weak competition.

As if to drive the point home about just how much ground the Engineers had to make up, a further game with Hamilton shortly thereafter ended 0–15. In fact, Lehigh would be shutout in five consecutive games, an NCAA record (since broken), and would not score again until their meeting with Georgetown on February 14. After a further pair of lopsided losses, the Engineers played probably their best game of the season when they took on the Harrison Maple Leafs. While their comeback ultimately fell short, it was the closest the team came to a victory all year and showed that the offense did have some fight in them.

Roster

Standings

Schedule and results

|-
!colspan=12 style=";" | Silver Anniversary Hamilton Tournament

|-
!colspan=12 style=";" | Regular Season

† Both Pennsylvania and Penn State fielded club teams at this time.

References

External links

Lehigh Mountain Hawks men's ice hockey seasons
Lehigh
Lehigh
Lehigh